Gianluigi Lentini (born 27 March 1969) is an Italian former professional footballer who played as a winger, usually on the left flank.

He was once the world's most expensive footballer, when he moved from Torino to Silvio Berlusconi's Milan for 18.5 billion Italian lire (£13 million) in 1992.

Club career
Born in Carmagnola, Piedmont, from Sicilian parents, Lentini grew up playing in the Torino youth system. After occasional appearances for the senior side, he spent the 1988–89 season on loan with Serie B club Ancona. He returned to a Torino team that had been relegated, but scored 6 goals as they won the Serie B title and were promoted straight back to Serie A for the 1990–91 season. Under the coach Emiliano Mondonico, he immediately won the Mitropa Cup in 1991, and he reached the final of the UEFA Cup in 1992, also achieving a third-place finish in Serie A during 1991–92 season.

His skill, talent, and notable performances with Torino attracted attention from larger clubs, as well as his first international call-up for Italy. He was eventually signed by A.C. Milan for a world record of £13 million in 1992, and was a key part of their side during the 1992–93 season under manager Fabio Capello, scoring 7 goals in Serie A as they won the league title, two Italian Supercups in 1992 and 1993, and as they also reached the Champions League Final, only to be defeated by Marseille.

A year after signing for Milan, at the age of 24, Lentini was involved in a serious car crash whilst driving home from a pre-season tournament in Genoa, in August 1993. He fractured his skull and damaged his eye socket and he spent about two days in a light coma. After the crash he never fully recovered his mercurial dribbling skills. Plagued by 'memory loss', periods of blurred vision, and 'dizzy spells' he was tormented by the spectre of what his career once was, when he returned to the pitch at the end of the 1993–94 season. His teammate at the time, Marcel Desailly, was compelled to confess that “You could see the skills, how he was before the accident and after the accident, the balance was completely different”. His career in Milan fizzled out and culminated in a European Cup medal and another Serie A title that season, but this was merely for filling the bench; a paltry return for the world's most expensive signing at the time. The next two seasons would see him make few appearances, although he collected another Italian Supercup with the club, as well as a UEFA Super Cup, in 1994, also receiving runners-up medals in the 1994 Intercontinental Cup and the 1995 UEFA Champions League Final. During his final season with the club, he won a third Serie A medal.

In 1996, he moved from Milan to Atalanta for a season, helping the club to a mid-table finish alongside Filippo Inzaghi, and he went on to play for six further clubs. He returned to Torino in 1997, spending three seasons with the club, and during the 1998–99 Serie B season, he helped his side to earn to promotion to Serie A the following season, where they once again would face relegation, before playing several seasons in the lower divisions with various other clubs. He subsequently played with Cosenza (2001–03), Cosenza F.C. (2003–04), Canelli (2004–08), Saviglianese (2008–09), and Nicese (2009–11), before ending his career with Carmagnola during the 2011–12 season, at the age of 43.

International career
Lentini initially made 2 appearances with the Italy national under-21 football team between 1987 and 1990, making his debut on 29 November 1989; he was a member of the squad that reached the semi-finals of the 1990 UEFA European Under-21 Championship, under manager Cesare Maldini, eventually finishing the tournament in third place. Whilst at Torino, he gained his first senior cap for the Italy national football team, in an international friendly in Terni against Belgium on 13 February 1991, which ended in a 0–0 draw. He later become a regular member of Arrigo Sacchi's Italy side during the 1994 FIFA World Cup Qualifying campaign, although he would miss out on the final tournament due to his inconsistent performances following his serious car accident in August 1993. He was capped on 13 occasions in total, making his last appearance on 6 November 1996.

Style of play

During his prime, prior to his road accident in 1993, which later affected his career, Lentini was considered a highly talented prospect, and was known for his pace, mobility, work-rate, physical strength, intelligence, and leadership. Although he was usually deployed as a left winger, he was capable of playing on either flank. In particular, he was highly regarded for his creativity, his excellent technical ability, agility, speed, balance, and his dribbling skills, as well as his crossing ability, which made him an extremely effective attacking threat on the wing, and allowed him to beat opponents in one on one situations and subsequently provide assists for his teammates.

Personal life
Lentini was married to Alexandra Carlsson from Sweden and their son Nicholas was born in 1996.

Nicholas is currently a goalkeeper.

Honours

Club
Milan
 UEFA Champions League: 1993–94
 Serie A: 1992–93, 1993–94, 1995–96
 Supercoppa Italiana: 1992, 1993, 1994

Torino
 Serie B: 1989–90, 2000–01
 Mitropa Cup: 1991

References

1969 births
Living people
People from Carmagnola
People of Sicilian descent
Italian footballers
Footballers from Piedmont
Association football midfielders
Italy international footballers
Italy under-21 international footballers
Serie A players
Serie B players
Serie D players
A.C. Ancona players
Torino F.C. players
A.C. Milan players
Cosenza Calcio 1914 players
A.S. Cosenza Calcio players
Atalanta B.C. players
UEFA Champions League winning players
Sportspeople from the Metropolitan City of Turin